Le Mené is a commune in the Côtes-d'Armor department of western France. The municipality was established on 1 January 2016 and consists of the former communes of Collinée, Le Gouray, Langourla, Plessala, Saint-Gilles-du-Mené, Saint-Gouéno and Saint-Jacut-du-Mené.

Population

See also 
Communes of the Côtes-d'Armor department

References 

Mene

Communes nouvelles of Côtes-d'Armor
Populated places established in 2016
2016 establishments in France